Edward Joseph "Catfoot" Cody (February 27, 1923 – October 16, 1994) was an American football player and coach.  He played professionally in the National Football League (NFL).

Biography
Cody was born on February 27, 1923, in Newington, Connecticut.; and died on October 16, 1994.

Career
Cody played at the collegiate level at Purdue University and Boston College., before being drafted by the Green Bay Packers in the fifth round of the 1946 NFL Draft.  He played fullback with Packers in 1947 and 1948, before moving to the Chicago Bears where he played fullback and defensive back in 1949 and 1950.

After retiring as a player, Cody went into coaching; he spent 4 seasons (1956-1959) as the head coach of the UC Santa Barbara Gauchos.  He then moved to the professional ranks, most notably as an assistant coach with the Oakland Raiders (1960) and the Chicago Bears (1965–70).  He was the defensive coordinator for the Southern California Sun in the World Football League.

Head coaching record

College

See also
 List of Green Bay Packers players

References

1923 births
1994 deaths
American football fullbacks
Boston College Eagles football players
Chicago Bears coaches
Chicago Bears players
Green Bay Packers players
Oakland Raiders coaches
Purdue Boilermakers football players
Southern California Sun coaches
UC Santa Barbara Gauchos football coaches
People from Newington, Connecticut